My Friend Irma is an American comedy television series that was broadcast on CBS from January 8, 1952, until June 25, 1954.

Premise and characters 
My Friend Irma began on radio and moved to television with a similar format. Irma Peterson ("the proverbial dumb blonde") and her roommate lived at Kathleen O'Reilly's boarding house in Manhattan. Irma was secretary for  Milton J. Clyde, the owner of a real estate company. Her initial roommate, Jane Stacy, was secretary for Richard Rhinelander III, the owner of an investment company. Stacy's transfer to Panama in 1953 brought Kay Foster, a newspaper reporter, in as Peterson's new roommate. Both Stacy and Foster sometimes spoke directly to the viewers, commenting on developments in an episode, a technique that George Burns used on The George Burns and Gracie Allen Show.

When the program began, Peterson was in love with Al (no last name given), an unemployed con man. Al was replaced by Joe Vance, a "more respectable boyfriend", who worked for a cleaning company. Other characters who frequently appeared were Brad Jackson, Kay's boyfriend; Professor Kropotkin, Irma's neighbor; and Bobby, Peterson's nephew. In 1953-54, Kropotkin was gone and Mr. Corday, an eccentric actor, was added.

Cast 
{| class="wikitable"
|+ Characters and Actors on My Friend Irma'''s TV Version
|-
! Character !! Actor
|-
| Irma Peterson || Marie Wilson
|-
| Jane Stacy || Cathy Lewis
|-
| Kay Foster || Mary Shipp
|-
| Al || Sid Tomack
|-
| Joe Vance || Hal March
|-
| Richard Rhinelander III || Brooks West
|-
| Brad Jackson || Gerald Mohr
|-
| Milton J. Clyde || Donald MacBride
|-
| Professor Kropotkin || Sig Arno
|-
| Mrs. O'Reilly || Gloria Gordon
|-
| Bobby Peterson || Richard Eyer
|-
| Mr. Corday || John Carradine
|-
| Richard's mother || Margaret DuMont
|}

Frank Bingham and Bob Lemond were the announcers.

 Schedule and production My Friend Irma debuted at 10:30 p.m. Eastern Time on Tuesdays. From April 1952 through June 1953, it was broadcast at 9:30 p.m. E. T. on Fridays. From October 1953 through June 1954, it was on Fridays at 10 p.m. E. T.

Cy Howard created the program. Richard Whorf was the director, and Nat Perrin was the producer. Howard and Frank Galen were the writers. Sponsors included Lever Brothers (Swan soap), and Kool cigarettes. The October 4, 1952, episode of My Friend Irma came from a "nearly completed" sound stage in CBS's new Television City facilities, making it the first series to be broadcast from that Hollywood site.

Critical reception
Critic Jack Gould wrote in The New York Times that the series's debut episode "was a decided disappointment". He felt that the innocent, fragile nature of Peterson was an asset, but that benefit was undermined because Wilson seemed to recite her lines more than portraying her character. Gould praised Lewis's performance for providing substance and pace. He criticized the writers for using "trite coincidences and old jokes". Whorf's direction received mixed reviews, described as "on the erratic side" although "in some of the lesser scenes he had nice imaginative touches".

Proposed sequel
When My Friend Irma ended, Wilson still had a $100,000-per-year contract with CBS. Network officials worked with Burns to try to develop a sequel, My Wife Irma, with Wilson as the star, but CBS rejected it. My Friend Irma'' had ended with Peterson's becoming engaged to Vance. The sequel would have picked up with her adapting to life as a newlywed.

Episode status
UCLA has one 1952 episode of the program in its archives.

References 

1952 American television series debuts
1954 American television series endings
1950s American comedy television series
CBS original programming
Television shows set in New York City